The solo discography of Slovak recording artist Miroslav Žbirka consists of fourteen studio albums, five export releases, eight compilations, one live recording, one extended play and twelve official singles. As a member of Modus, Žbirka contributed to two albums of the group, as well as a number of singles issued from 1967 until 1980.

Albums

Studio albums

Compilations

Live albums

Export albums

Extended plays

Singles

As lead artist

Other charted songs

Notes
A  The song also reached at number #23 on the Czech Mobile Music Chart.

References
General

Specific

External links

 
 
 Miroslav Žbirka at Billboard
 Miroslav Žbirka on Discogs
 

Pop music discographies